Willie is an extinct town in Liberty County, in the U.S. state of Georgia. The GNIS classifies it as a populated place.

History
A post office called Willie was established in 1911, and remained in operation until 1914. The community was named after Nellie Willie Lee Tuten, the child of a first settler.

The hamlet of Willie disappeared when the town site was seized for the creation of a military installation. Residents were evacuated in the 1940s. Today, the former town site is within the borders of Fort Stewart.

References

Populated places in Liberty County, Georgia
Ghost towns in Georgia (U.S. state)